Cyanate is an anion with the structural formula , usually written . It also refers to any salt containing it, such as ammonium cyanate.

It is an isomer of the much less stable fulminate anion .

A cyanate ester is an organic compound containing the cyanate group.

The cyanate ion is an ambidentate ligand, forming complexes with a metal ion in which either the nitrogen or oxygen atom may be the electron-pair donor. It can also act as a bridging ligand.

Cyanate ion 
The three atoms in a cyanate ion lie on a straight line, giving the ion a linear structure. The electronic structure is described most simply as
 :Ö̤−C≡N:
with a single C−O bond and a triple C≡N bond. The infrared spectrum of a cyanate salt has a band at ca. 2096 cm−1; such a high frequency is characteristic of a triple bond. The cyanate ion is a Lewis base. Both the oxygen and nitrogen atoms carry a lone pair of electrons and either one or the other, or both can be donated to Lewis acid acceptors. It can be described as an ambidentate ligand.

Cyanate salts 
Sodium cyanate is isostructural with sodium fulminate, confirming the linear structure of the cyanate ion. It is made industrially by heating a mixture of sodium carbonate and urea.
Na2CO3 + 2 OC(NH2)2 -> 2 NaNCO + CO2 + 2 NH3 + H2O
A similar reaction is used to make potassium cyanate. Cyanates are produced when cyanides are oxidized. Use of this fact is made in cyanide decontamination processes where oxidants such as permanganate and hydrogen peroxide are used to convert toxic cyanide to safer cyanate.

Complexes with the cyanate ion 
Cyanate is an ambidentate ligand which can donate the pair of electrons on the nitrogen atom or the oxygen atom, or both. Structurally the isomers can be distinguished by the geometry of the complex. In N-bonded cyanate complexes the M−NCO unit sometimes has a linear structure, but with O-bonded cyanate the M−O−C unit is bent. Thus, the silver cyanato complex, [Ag(NCO)2]−, has a linear structure as shown by X-ray crystallography. However, the crystal structure of silver cyanate shows zigzag chains of nitrogen atoms and silver atoms. There also exists a structure
    NCO
   /   \
 Ni    Ni
   \   /
    OCN
in which the Ni-N-C group is bent.

Infrared spectroscopy has been used extensively to distinguish between isomers. Many complexes of divalent metals are N-bonded. O-bonding has been suggested for complexes of the type [M(OCN)6]n−, M = Mo(III), Re(IV) and Re(V). The yellow complex Rh(PPh3)3(NCO) and orange complex Rh(PPh3)3(OCN) are linkage isomers and show differences in their infrared spectra which can be used for diagnosis (PPh3 stands for triphenylphosphine).

The cyanate ion can bridge between two metal atoms by using both its donor atoms. For example, this structure is found in the compound [Ni2(NCO)2(en)2][BPh4]2. In this compound both the Ni−N−C unit and Ni−O−C unit are bent, even though in the first case donation is through the nitrogen atom.

Cyanate in organic compounds 
The functional group  is known as a nitrile oxide.  

Organic compounds that contain the functional group −N=C=O are known as isocyanates. It is conventional in organic chemistry to write isocyanates with two double bonds, which accords with a simplistic valence bond theory of the bonding. In nucleophilic substitution reactions cyanate usually forms an isocyanate. Isocyanates are widely used in the manufacture of polyurethane products and pesticides; methyl isocyanate, used to make pesticides, was a major factor in the Bhopal disaster.

Compounds that contain the group −O−C≡N, are known as a cyanates, or cyanate esters. Aryl cyanates such are phenyl cyanate, C6H5OCN, can be formed by a reaction of phenol with cyanogen chloride, ClCN, in the presence of a base.

References

External links 
 Material Safety Data Sheet for potassium cyanate

Bibliography 

 
Oxyanions
Functional groups